Elaeagnus triflora (millaa millaa in a Queensland Australian aboriginal language) is a climbing plant of the family Elaeagnaceae. Its native range encompasses Taiwan, Malesia, and the Australian state of Queensland. Its fruit is considered bush tucker in Australia.

References 

triflora
Flora of Queensland
Flora of Taiwan
Flora of Malesia